Gerald F. Tape (1915 – November 20, 2005) was an American physicist.

Education
He received his Ph.D. in nuclear physics in 1939 from the University of Michigan.

Career
From 1939 to 1942 he was instructor of physics at Cornell University.
During World War II (1942 - 1945) he worked at MIT Radiation Laboratory (nicknamed the Rad Lab).
He was deputy director of the Brookhaven National Laboratory
He was Atomic Energy Commission Commissioner : July 15, 1963 - April 30, 1969.
He was then U.S. representative to the International Atomic Energy Agency 1973 - 1980.
He retired in 1980.

Awards
In 1986 he was elected to the National Academy of Engineering "For distinguished leadership in the national and international development and control of nuclear energy."
In 1987 he received the Enrico Fermi Award "For a distinguished career in the administration, development, and advancement of U.S. and international atomic energy, as well as contributions to the nonproliferation of nuclear weapons, with special recognition for his integrity."

Books
 Attitudes : Past and Future - U.S. Atomic Energy Commission, 1966
 What Next for Nuclear Power - U.S. Atomic Energy Commission, 1968

References

20th-century American physicists
1915 births
University of Michigan alumni
Cornell University faculty
Massachusetts Institute of Technology faculty
2005 deaths